Dromore St Dympna's is a Gaelic Athletic Association club based in the village of Dromore in County Tyrone, Northern Ireland.

History
The club was established in 1933.

On Sunday 14 October 2007, Dromore made history by winning the Tyrone Senior Football Championship for the first time by beating Coalisland 0-14 to 0-4 at Healy Park, Omagh.

On Sunday 18 October 2009, Dromore won their second Tyrone Senior Football Championship by beating Ardboe 1-14 to 1-13. Captain Colm McCullagh converted a penalty three minutes into injury time in dramatic circumstances at Healy Park Omagh.

Achievements
 Tyrone Senior Football Championship (4)
 2007, 2009, 2011, 2021
 Tyrone Intermediate Football Championship 
 1975
 Tyrone Junior Football Championship (1)
 1963

Notable players
 Ryan McMenamin
 Niall Sludden

References

External links
Official website of Dromore St Dympna's GFC

Gaelic games clubs in County Tyrone
Gaelic football clubs in County Tyrone